757 Kepri Jaya Football Club is an Indonesian football club based in Batam, Riau Islands. They currently compete in Liga 3.

History
The club were formed in 2017 following a merger of PS Bintang Jaya Asahan and YSK 757 Karimun and currently play in Liga 3.

YSK 757 is a football club under the Governor of Riau Islands, Nurdin Basirun who won the 2016 ISC Liga Nusantara for the Riau Islands zone in his debut in the Indonesian League competition.

Stadium
They play their home matches at Gelora Citramas Stadium, Batam.

Honours
 Liga 3 Riau Islands
 Champions: 2019, 2021

References

Football clubs in Indonesia
Football clubs in Riau Islands
Association football clubs established in 2017
2017 establishments in Indonesia